Dasychira cinnamomea, the cinnamon tussock moth, is a species of tussock moth in the family Erebidae. It is found in North America.

The MONA or Hodges number for Dasychira cinnamomea is 8300.

References

Further reading

 
 
 

Lymantriinae
Articles created by Qbugbot
Moths described in 1866